Henry Chidley Reynolds (26 May 1849 – 19 September 1925) was a New Zealand farm manager, butter manufacturer and exporter. He was born at Beeny, St Juliot, Cornwall, England, in 1849. He began manufacturing butter in 1886 and soon adopted "Anchor" as a brand name. After his butter won an award at the Centennial International Exhibition in Melbourne he began exporting butter to England. Because of financial difficulties he sold his business to the New Zealand Dairy Association in 1896 and the association adopted the "Anchor" brand.

References

1849 births
1925 deaths
New Zealand farmers
Farmers from Cornwall
British emigrants to New Zealand
New Zealand people of Cornish descent